The Immaculate Heart of Mary Seminary or IHMS, located at Pacifico Cabalit St., Taloto, Tagbilaran City, Bohol, Philippines, is a diocesan college seminary established in 1950 by Julio Rosales, Bishop of Tagbilaran, in implementation of Canon 1354, no. 2 of the 1917 Code of Canon Law that required the Bishop to establish such institution.

It was first administered by the Divine Word Missionaries or SVDs for a contract of 10 years. To date, IHMS has educated hundreds of diocesan and religious priests (see Paring Bol-anon) as well as lay alumni now serving in different capacities all over the Philippines and abroad. Currently,  there are more than a hundred seminarians studying at IHMS. The seminary is a unifying factor for the Paring Bol-anon and the different lay alumni groups since most of the members were once seminarians or professors there.

Recent history
On August 22, 2000, the Immaculate Heart of Mary Seminary celebrated its Golden Jubilee with the theme: "Mary and the Priesthood and Evangelization."

In January 2010, Bishop Leonardo Y. Medroso announced that the Immaculate Heart of Mary Seminary High School Department would re-open in June 2010.

Milestones
 August 22, 1948 – laying down of cornerstone (Feast of the Immaculate Heart of Mary)
 July 16, 1949 – pillars of the building built
 1950 – The Immaculate Heart of Mary Minor Seminary was officially founded
 1960 – The Diocesan Clergy officially took over administration from the SVD
 1961 – The College Department was opened
 1989 – The Minor Seminary gradually phased out
 1990 – The 40th anniversary celebration
 August 22, 2000 – the Golden Jubilee was celebrated, with the theme "Mary and the Priesthood and Evangelization"
 2010 – The Minor Seminary was reopened by June; I.H.M.S. celebrated 60 years of existence

Administration

 Rector – Rev. Fr. Harold Anthony Parilla, STL
 Procurator – Rev. Fr. Roberto Supremo M.A
 Prefect of Discipline – Rev. Fr. Absalon Florenosos M.A
 Spiritual Director – Rev. Fr. Roque Dela Peña, M.A
 Assistant Spiritual Director– Rev. Msgr. Jesus B. Ligason
 Academic Dean College – Rev. Fr. Jose Conrado Estafia, PhD.
 Prefect of Discipline Pre-College – Rev. Fr. Christian Tecson, JCL
 Spiritual Director Pre-college- Rev. Fr. Roberto Supremo
 Registrar – Mrs. Bernadette Aguillo
 Cashier – Ms. Merce Lysa R. Balijon
 Disbursing Officer - Mr. Eusebio Varquez
 Bookkeeper - Mrs. Zoila E. Jimenez
 Prefect of Discipline High School Department – Rev. Fr. Christian Tecson, STL
 Spiritual Director High School Department – Rev. Fr. Garry Guiritan
 Music Director  – Rev. Fr. Irvin Garsuta
 Principal High School Department – Mrs. Policronia B. Garsuta

Traditions

Escudo or escutcheon

The shield, called escudo or escutcheon of the Immaculate Heart of Mary Seminary, its history and meaning was drafted by Bernard Fuertes. It was drawn and finalized by popular Tagbilaran artists, Ric Ramasola and Tony Arat in 1961.

The escudo or escutcheon has five (5) major elements. The "base" represents God's omnipotent power and grace protecting or shielding Mary – represented by the monogram "M" – from original sin, as it was said by David: "God, his was is immaculate...He is the shield of all that trust in Him." (2 Kings 22:31) The "Flaming Heart" represents Mary's loving and maternal concern for the seminarians and professors of the seminary. It is surrounded by "Twelve Stars" – adapted from her appearance to St. Bernadette of Lourdes in France telling her that "I am the Immaculate Conception," hence the title, Immaculate Heart of Mary, is adopted. Over the "escudo" is an open book representing the continuous search for knowledge by the seminarians through diligent studies. It is highlighted by the "Burning Torch" representing the "lumen Christi," or the light of Christ, which is always given to those who earnestly seek for knowledge and truth.

The search for knowledge goes along with the cultivation of the following good habits (other authors call them virtues) that an IHM seminarian should endeavor to ultimately internalize such as Pietas or Piety means the habit or virtue of rendering respect and obedience not only to God's commandment and those of the Church but also to the laws of the State. Further, it means giving due respect and honor to both religious and civil superiors. Piety must be founded on the virtue of humility, without which the former would be nigh, impossible to achieve.

Scientia or Science is the possession of this, especially divine science, is the result of a continuous search for knowledge under the aid of divine guidance; Sanctitas or Holiness is a virtue that is a must for all, most especially for seminarians and God's ministers. According to traditional theology, it is a habit of not being involved too much in worldly affairs, although in reality living in the world. It corresponds to the pursuit of knowledge. The more unworldly have attained a higher degree of science and sanctity. That is why St. Thomas Aquinas is called the "Angelic Doctor" because he attained the highest degree of these virtues. He is thereby honored by the Church and made the Patron of Catholic schools.

The year 1950 represents the seminary's year of foundation by Bishop Julio Rosales of the Diocese of Tagbilaran. The circlets at the base of the monogram of Mary and at the bottom of the "escudo" is an abstract or idealistic representation of the Society of the Divine Word (Societas Verbum Divini) or SVD whose fathers managed the seminary for the first 10 years of its existence under the first set of professors with Rev. Alphonse M. Mildner, SVD as Rector, together with Fr. Simeon O. Valerio (ret. Bishop of Calapan, Or. Mindoro), Fr. Victor Drewes and Fr. Victor Tunkel.

St. Joseph Vocation Society (SJVS)

The St. Joseph Vocation Society or SJVS is a scholarship foundation of the Diocese of Tagbilaran and IHMS. It was established in 1960 by then Fr. Felix S. Zafra (now deceased) with the purpose of supporting poor but deserving seminarians. Through the years, SJVS has sent many seminarians to the seminary who were ordained priests. Most of the Paring Bol-anon have received SJVS support. Funds come mainly from ordinary people through yearly house-to-house campaign by the seminarians. In 1989, SJVS launched a one-million-peso fund campaign. The Paring Bol-anon responded to the appeal. About two-thirds of the funds have been collected. In the United States, the proceeds of PB-USA Reunion dinners and concerts all go to the trust fund. Every year, the whole Paring Bol-anon offer masses for the intentions of SJVS benefactors and donors.

Jeduthun ensemble
The Jeduthun Ensemble is the Schola Cantorum or the official choir of IHMS. Conducted by a priest Music Director, the Jeduthun serves as the backbone of all choral singing within the bounds of the seminary and its traditional yearly concert performed in the capital city for the local community. From in-house performances to town fiesta gigs, the Jeduthun Ensemble's reputation as a solid, high quality, well-arranged and conducted choral group has easily landed them, in the past, invitations to perform in other venues outside of Bohol, like Manila, Iloilo, Dumaguete and Mindanao. One could almost say that IHMS' musical practices and tradition has been the seedbed of many a present musical successes of many of its alumni in the field of music, like the pioneering acts of the ABCD Quartet of the '60s, the celebrated Singing Priests of San Francisco in mid '80s, the well-choreographed Singing Priests of Louisiana in late '80s and, not so recently, the very popular group, the high-powered Singing Priests of Tagbilaran (SPOT) in the late '90s. IHMS has also produced quite a number of prolific songwriters (TQ Solis Jr., Jimmy Borja) many of whom have won honors in different songwriters' competitions outside the four walls of the seminary, while some others have even chosen the field of music as their field of profession and livelihood.

To date, Jeduthun Ensemble alumni have been in varying degrees a continuing presence in the field of music locally and internationally. While some have made it in the music business (see Jimmy Borja, Arnold Zamora), many of its priest-products (see Paring Bol-anon) have also demonstrated as much propensity in their musical pursuit as artists and producers in their respective rights. Like the pioneering Singing Priests of San Francisco, who released the first ever studio-recorded Paring Bol-anon albums, Inspirational Songs (1985) and Christmas in San Francisco (1986), it did not take long for others PBs to follow suit. In 1993, Fr. Roland Pacudan released 2 musical albums of original works in Hawaii with Citizens of the World and Roads of Life (1994).Fr. Roland Pacudan authored three books, one in 2009 entitled "Secundum Ordinem Vitae and two in 2010 entitled "Ego Sum Qui Sum and "Ordo Ab Chao". While in New Orleans, Fr. J. Roel Lungay produced four compilations of original songs written by him, and with other PBs like Frs. TQ Solis, Jr. Elpidio Biliran, Jr. and Arnold Zamora, with Mass of St. Rita (1993), Dear Jesus (1994), Music Revisited, Vol. 1 (1995) and One Heart, One Mind (1996). In 1998, spearheaded by nationally known composer and arranger, Fr. Arnold Zamora, the Singing Priests of Tagbilaran released their self-titled CD, SPOT, in San Francisco, while another longtime PB, in that same year, Msgr. Floro Arcamo, also of San Francisco, with the help of long-time confrere, Fr. Rolando Caverte, and Suzanne St. John, released, too, his debut solo album of cover songs titled, Songs of Faith And Inspiration (1998). These and all others truly highlight musical achievements of Paring Bol-anons as well as other IHMS students which had its lowly beginning as alumni of the old Jeduthun Ensemble.

Jeduthun concerts and plays
 Sons of Jeduthun, IHMS Silver Jubilee Celebration 1975, Bohol Cultural Center
 Kura sa Cogon, IHMS Auditorium and selected Bohol municipalities, 1977
 Jeduthun Ensemble, Bohol and Mindanao Tour, 1978
 Jeduthun in Concert, Divine Word College of Tagbilaran and selected Bohol municipalities, 1979
 Confido in Domino, Divine Word College of Tagbilaran Gymnasium, January 21–23, 1983
 Ite Missa Est
 Eukaristikon , Divine Word College of Tagbilaran. 1987
 The New Generation of Jeduthun, February, 1987, in commemoration of the first anniversary of the People Power EDSA Revolution
 Jeduthun Ensemble in Concert, a town-to-town Concert Tour in Bohol province and including one in Davao City, 1988
 IHMS Ruby Jubilee Concert, IHMS Auditorium, 1990
 Everlasting Light, Divine Word College of Tagbilaran Gymnasium, 1996
 Hiusatlo, Divine Word College of Tagbilaran Gymnasium, 1997
 Jubilaeum 2000 – IHMS Golden Jubilee Concert, Divine Word College of Tagbilaran Gymnasium, 2000

Lagdâ sa Pamuyô
The Lagdâ sa Pamuyô, literally translated as "Handbook of Rules", contains the rules of discipline that prescribe the do's and don't's in the Immaculate Heart of Mary Seminary, or what should and should not be done.

Vocation tour
Vocation tour was an annual 3-day tour around the Province of Bohol during the late 1970s. All the seminarians, both high school and college, together with the faculty-priests, are divided into 3 or 4 groups with each group assigned specific towns/municipalities to visit. The entire province is covered during the tour. The parish priest would host one group and would schedule them to visit the different parochial and public schools in the town. There the seminarians would talk about life in the seminary and render a presentation to the students, inviting them to enter the seminary.

Summer apostolate
The Summer Apostolate is part of the formation of seminarians that will allow them to engage in real-life apostolate work. It is usually held from April to May each year. It is during this period that the college seminarians are assigned to work in the different towns/municipalities of Bohol under the guidance of the Parish Priest.

Paring Bol-anon
See: List of IHMS alumni Paring Bol-anon

The Paring Bol-anon or the Bohol Clergy is the fraternity of Roman Catholic priests who come from Bohol, Philippines, the majority of whom are currently serving in the parishes of the two dioceses in Bohol, namely, the Diocese of Tagbilaran and the Diocese of Talibon, while a good number of them are also serving outside the province, most notably Manila, Mindanao and the United States, either as bishops, chaplains, pastors or guest priests.

Bohol Major Seminarians
It all started in the mid and late seventies when IHMS alumni who moved on to the different major theological schools for their final priestly formation began organizing themselves into a viable entity or an organization wherein they can represent and speak for themselves on issues affecting the seminarians and students aspiring to become priests one day. Hence, the birth of the official organization of seminarians called the Bohol Major Seminarians. During these times many parish priests in the local parishes were not totally supportive of the seminary's and the diocese's summer program of sending seminarians to the different parishes for pastoral exposure in order to develop their skills in pastoral work. There were some seminarians who complained about being arbitrarily sent home by some parish priests and ended up being deprived of that rare and unique opportunity to learn first-hand the ins and outs of parish work, while on the other hand, many others, who were welcomed in their parish assignments, experienced a tremendously rich opportunity of actual parish life and even told stories of their hands-on experience which not only caused many to envy but also a major concern to the major seminarians and seminary formators. And so evolved from this the organization of seminarians called the BMS or the Bohol Major Seminarians, which eventually splintered into smaller groups, depending on what area of the Philippines they pursued further studies: BMS-Tagbilaran, BMS-Cebu, BMS-Mindanao and BMS-Manila. Eventually the BMS proved to be the catalyst that sparked the transformation of the Diocese of Tagbilaran and its clergy as well as the official founding of the Paring Bol-anon as a priestly fraternity in 1979 in a synod-like assembly of clergy that issued the first ever Diocesan Thrust.
 BMS-Tagbilaran – College seminarians studying at IHMS
 BMS-Cebu – Theology students studying at Seminario Mayor de San Carlos
 BMS-Manila – Theology students studying at UST Pontifical Seminary, San Jose Major Seminary (Ateneo) and at Tagaytay seminaries (MSP, SASMA, DWS)
 BMS-Mindanao – Theology students studying at any Mindanao seminaries (REMASE, DIOPEM, St. John Vianney)

Alumni associations
Also See:List of notable alumni of the Immaculate Heart of Mary Seminary

 Paring Bol-anon – The association of Boholano priests based in different locations.
 BANGKÂ – (Bol-anon Alang sa Nagkahiusang Katuyuan) the alumni association based in Manila was organized and registered with the SEC in the mid 1990s with Atty Mannix Cimafranca as the President.
 TIPASÎ – originally Tagbilaran Integration of ex-Priests And ex-Seminarians Inc., the alumni association based in Tagbilaran City. It was organized in 1986 with Timmy Balane as interim president. In 2000, during the presidency of Jun Amora, the acronym was solely used and the acronym's meaning dropped since the non-Tagbilaran based alumni were uneasy with the use of the word Tagbilaran. The word, TIPASI (in the vernacular meaning, an unhusked grain of rice), was thus used in the context of its meaning in the vernacular. It turned out to be the right move as other branches of TIPASI were established.
 TIPASÎ-Tagbilaran – the alumni association based in Tagbilaran City with Ariel Dominquez as president in 2006.
 TIPASÎ-Talibon – the alumni association based in Talibon with Palug Logroño as president in 2006.
 TIPASÎ-Cebu – the alumni association based in Cebu City with Atty. Aquilino Felicitas as president in 2006.
 Charlatans – coined by former Rector, now Bishop, Zacharias C. Jimenez for the freshman class of 1976, College Department
 Baboga – or, Baston Bobits Gang, name adopted by the HS Batch '80 for their class;
 Hoi Polloi Society – 1999

Publications

 Our Seminary – School Yearbook (also known as Annual)
 Legité – The official college newsletter
 Sal Terrae –  The official high school newsletter
 Precis – The official prayer and song book of the seminary
 ISDÂ Pahayagan – The official newsletter of the Paring Bol-anon all over the world. "The Paring Bol-anon is ISDA; ISDA is the Paring Bol-anon." (Fr. Vicente Nunag, III, Ulo Sa Isda, ISDA, July 1993 Issue)
 Scriptum  – The unofficial and unauthorized newsletter of the IHMS Batch HS '80 and College '84

Gallery

See also

 Paring Bol-anon
 Diocese of Tagbilaran
 Diocese of Talibon

References

External links
 IHMS Names Database
 IHMS Alumni Corner
 Paring Bol-anon Music
 Paring Bol-anon WWW
 Paring Bol-anon Music Station
 Ecclesiastical Territories of the Philippines

Education in Tagbilaran
Christian organizations established in 1950
Catholic organizations established in the 20th century
Catholic seminaries in the Philippines
1950 establishments in the Philippines